KMAM (1530 AM, "The Bullet") is an American radio station licensed to serve the community of Butler, Missouri.  The station's broadcast license is held by Bates County Broadcasting Company. KMAM has been owned and operated by members of the Thornton family since it was founded in 1962.

KMAM is a "daytimer", licensed to operate only from local sunrise to local sunset to protect radio stations KFBK in Sacramento, California, and WCKY in Cincinnati, Ohio from skywave interference. The station was assigned the call sign "KMAM" by the Federal Communications Commission (FCC).

Programming
KMAM broadcasts a full service country music format, including programming from Citadel Media, in simulcast with sister station KMOE (92.1 FM). In addition to its music programming, KMAM airs local news, farm and market reports, ABC News Radio, a daily obituary report, and a tradio program called Swap Shop. Sunday programming includes Gospel music, local church services, Gun Talk Radio, plus news and sports updates.

References

External links
KMAM official website
Facebook Page

 

MAM
Country radio stations in the United States
Radio stations established in 1962
Bates County, Missouri
1962 establishments in Missouri
MAM